Allysa Seely  (born January 4, 1989) is an American paratriathlete and gold medalist at the 2016 and 2020 Summer Paralympics.

Background
Seely was born on January 4, 1989. She grew up in Glendale, Arizona and graduated from Mountain Ridge High School in 2007.  She attended Arizona State University afterwards.

In September 2008 Seely raced her first triathlon as part of a group that raises money for cancer research and then joined the Arizona State University triathlon team. In 2010 Seely was diagnosed with Chiari II malformation, basilar invagination, and Ehlers-Danlos syndrome. In August, 2013, her left leg was amputated below the knee.

In 2020 Seely was diagnosed with endocarditis as well as a blood clot in her heart.

Sports career
Seely was nationally ranked in the triathlon prior to her diagnoses and amputation. She is a three-time world champion at the paratriathlon, having won in 2015, 2016 and 2018.

2016 Summer Paralympics
Seely competed in the 2016 Summer Paralympics.  She won the gold medal in the Paratriathlon. She also competed in Athletics, the Women's 200 meters where she placed 6th.

2020 Summer Paralympics
Seely competed at the 2020 Summer Paralympics where she defended her title and won her second gold medal in the paratriathlon.

Personal life
Seely currently resides in Colorado Springs, Colorado with her golden retriever and trains at the Olympic Training Center.

Competitive history

See also
 United States at the 2016 Summer Paralympics
 United States at the 2020 Summer Paralympics
 Paratriathlon at the 2016 Summer Paralympics
 Paratriathlon at the 2020 Summer Paralympics

References

External links
 
 
 
 

1989 births
Living people
American female triathletes
American amputees
Paratriathletes of the United States
Paralympic medalists in paratriathlon
Paralympic gold medalists for the United States
Paratriathletes at the 2016 Summer Paralympics
Paratriathletes at the 2020 Summer Paralympics
Medalists at the 2016 Summer Paralympics
Medalists at the 2020 Summer Paralympics
Track and field athletes from Arizona
Arizona State University alumni
Sportspeople from Glendale, Arizona
Arizona State Sun Devils women's track and field athletes
21st-century American women